The 2018 IAAF World Race Walking Team Championships was the 28th edition of the global team racewalking competition organised by the International Association of Athletics Federations.

Overview
The programme remained unchanged, with senior men's races over 20 km and 50 km, a 20 km senior women's race, and junior category events for both sexes over 10 km. However, following the approval by the IAAF of the women's 50 km walk as an official event, for the first time women were permitted to enter the 50 km. A separate women's 50 km was not scheduled, but women were allowed to enter the men's event and were treated as equal competitors for team scoring.

Results

Men

Women

Results

Women's 50 km

Medal table

Overall
Overall of the 12 events senior and junior (men and women).

Senior
Men and women's 4 events (individual and team)

References

External links
 World Athletics competition page
 IAAF WORLD RACE WALKING TEAM CHAMPIONSHIPS - FACTS & FIGURES

World Athletics Race Walking Team Championships
World Race Walking Team Championships